Cyana asticta is a moth of the family Erebidae. It was described by George Hampson in 1909. It is found in Australia.

References

Cyana
Moths described in 1909